Samoa A is a national representative rugby union team of the Samoan rugby union. It is the second-tier side to the Samoa national rugby union team. Samoa A competes in the Pacific Challenge, formerly known as the Pacific Rugby Cup, against teams including Tonga A and Fiji Warriors. Since 2016, the team has also competed in the Americas Pacific Challenge.

Between 2006 and 2010, Samoa was represented by two teams at the Pacific Rugby Cup; Upolu Samoa and Savaii Samoa. The two teams were replaced in 2011 by Samoa A which is now the sole Samoan representative in the Pacific Challenge. The tournament is now mainly contested by national 'A' teams.

International results
Matches against national teams or national 'A" teams up to and including 2014 Pacific Rugby Cup:

Record

Honours
Pacific Rugby Cup
 Runner-up: 2011, 2012, 2013.

Americas Pacific Challenge
 Winner: 2018.

Season standings

Pacific Challenge (formerly Pacific Rugby Cup)
{| class="wikitable" style="text-align:center;"
|- border=1 cellpadding=5 cellspacing=0
! style="width:20px;"|Year
! style="width:20px;"|Pos
! style="width:20px;"|Pld
! style="width:20px;"|W
! style="width:20px;"|D
! style="width:20px;"|L
! style="width:25px;"|F
! style="width:25px;"|A
! style="width:25px;"|+/-
! style="width:20px;"|TB
! style="width:20px;"|LB
! style="width:20px;"|Pts
! style="width:20px;"|Final
! style="width:20em;" align=left|Notes
|- 
|align=left|2018
| align="center" | 3rd
|3
|1
|0
|2
|82
|72
| +10
|—
|—
|5
|—
|
|- 
|align=left|2017
|4th
|3
|0
|0
|3
|78
|112
| -34
|0
|1
|1
|—
|
|- 
|align=left|2016
|2nd
|3
|2
|0
|1
|98
|56
| +42
|2
|0
|10
|—
|
|- 
|align=left|2015
|2nd
|3
|2
|0
|1
|69
|87
| -18
|1
|0
|3
|—
|Finished 2nd in Pool A
|- 
|align=left|2014
| 4th
| 4 || 1 || 0 || 3 || 82 || 91 ||  -9 || 1 || 2 ||  7
| — ||align=left| Finished 4th in Pool B
|-
|align=left|2013
| 2nd
| 6 || 2 || 0 || 4 || 134 || 198 || -64 || 1 || 1 || 10
| — ||align=left| Runner-up on league table (no final)
|-
|align=left|2012
| 2nd
| 8 || 3 || 0 || 5 ||191 || 238 ||-47 || 0 || 1 || 13
| — ||align=left| Runner-up on league table (no final)
|-
|align=left|2011
| 2nd
| 8 || 3 || 0 || 5 || 135 || 171 || -36 || 1 || 2 || 15
| — ||align=left| Runner-up on league table (no final)
|}

Americas Pacific Challenge
{| class="wikitable" style="text-align:center;"
|- border=1 cellpadding=5 cellspacing=0
! style="width:20px;"|Year
! style="width:20px;"|Pos
! style="width:20px;"|Pld
! style="width:20px;"|W
! style="width:20px;"|D
! style="width:20px;"|L
! style="width:25px;"|F
! style="width:25px;"|A
! style="width:25px;"|+/-
! style="width:20px;"|TB
! style="width:20px;"|LB
! style="width:20px;"|Pts
! style="width:20px;"|Final
! style="width:20em;" align=left|Notes
|-
|align=left|2018
|1st
| 3 || 3 || 0 || 0 || 97 || 72 || +25 || 2 || 0 ||14
| — ||align=left| First on league table (no final)
|-
|align=left|2017
|4th
| 3 || 1 || 0 || 2 || 90 ||142 || -52 || 2 || 1 || 7
| — ||align=left| Fourth on league table (no final)
|-
|align=left|2016
|3rd
| 3 || 2 || 0 || 1 || 97 || 103 || -6 || 1 || 0 || 9
| — ||align=left| Third on league table (no final)
|}

References

External links
2014 Pacific Rugby Cup News on oceaniarugby.com

Samoa national rugby union team
Second national rugby union teams